Lac Daumesnil is a lake in the Bois de Vincennes, a public park in Paris, France. Its surface area is 0.12 km2. It is surrounded by "promenade Maurice Boitel".

External links 
 

Daumesnil
Landforms of Paris